Scholderer is a surname. Notable people with the surname include:

 Otto Scholderer (1834–1902), German painter
 Victor Scholderer (1880–1971), German bibliographer